Sääre may refer to several places in Estonia:
Sääre, Hiiu County, village in Pühalepa Parish, Hiiu County
Sääre, Pärnu County, village in Kihnu Parish, Pärnu County
Sääre, Saare County, village in Torgu Parish, Saare County

See also
Saare (disambiguation)